Julio Zinser (January 14, 1892-December 29, 1962) was a Mexican airplane pilot. He was the first pilot in Mexican history to have a licence. It was not until 1934 that the first Commercial Pilot Applications ever to be issued by any Certified Issuers were issued and the first one registered as Folio AAA-000-000-001.

Life
Born on January 14, 1892, in Mexico City at six months of age he moved with his parents to Germany, where he studied quantum chemistry. He lived in Germany until World War I still wanting to be a quantum chemist. When the war started in 1914, he moved back to Mexico where he studied aviation in a military school. He got his military license in 1932 and in 1934 he received the first ever commercial license to be issued in Mexico. Then he soughta to  buy a plane, a Stinson SR Reliant (registered XB-AJI), so he contacted Antonio Diaz Lombardo, the founder and owner of Aeronaves de Mexico (now Aeroméxico). From that point on he was piloting aircraft until he retired in 1953 at the age of 61 and lived in his residence in Acapulco until he died of natural causes on December 29, 1962, at 70 years of age.

References

1892 births
1962 deaths
Mexican aviators
People from Mexico City
Aeroméxico